Günther Marxer (born 3 June 1964) is a Liechtensteiner former alpine skier who competed in the 1984 Winter Olympics, 1988 Winter Olympics, and 1992 Winter Olympics.

External links
 sports-reference.com

1964 births
Living people
Liechtenstein male alpine skiers
Olympic alpine skiers of Liechtenstein
Alpine skiers at the 1984 Winter Olympics
Alpine skiers at the 1988 Winter Olympics
Alpine skiers at the 1992 Winter Olympics
Place of birth missing (living people)